This is a list of Fellows of the Royal College of Music.

Each year the Royal College of Music bestows a number of honorary awards and fellowships on individuals who have made an exceptional contribution to life at the RCM and the wider musical community.

Unlike fellows of the Royal Academy of Music, it is not necessary that fellows of the Royal College of Music be former students at the College, although many have been.  Many others are internationally known musicians with no associations with the College at all.

List of fellows

 Claudio Abbado, 1989
 John Ackroyd, 1988
 Christopher Adey, 1989
 Hervey Alan, 1972
 Sir Walter Galpin Alcock, 1927
 A Alexander, 1938
 Dimitri Alexeev, 2014
 Basil Allchin, 1928
 Sir Hugh Allen, 1938
 Sir Thomas Allen, 1987
 Martin André, 2014
 HK Andrews, 1961
 Felix Andrievsky, 1993
 Hugo Anson, 1940
 Sir Thomas Armstrong, 1925
 Christopher Arnander, 1989
 Denis Arnold, 1981
 Sir Malcolm Arnold, 1983
 Cecil Aronowitz, 1971
 Alexander Arthur, 1938
 Dennis Arundell, 1970
 JJ Astor, 1937
 Katherine Atholl, 1925
 Richard Austin, 1962
 Simon Bainbridge, 1997
 Edgar Bainton, 1935
 George Baker, 1963
 Dame Janet Baker, 1976
 Andrew Ball, 2006
 Barbara Banner, 1966
 Sir Granville Bantock, 1934
 Evelyn Barbirolli, 1983
 Daniel Barenboim, 1981
 Kenneth Barritt, 1976
 John Barstow, 1981
 Marmaduke Barton, 1948
 Peter Bassano, 1997
 Sir Arnold Bax, 1927
 Hugh Bean, 1968
 Sir Thomas Beecham, 1922
 William Bell, 1926
 Nicola Benedetti MBE, 2014
 George Benjamin, 1993
 Lionel Benson, 1942
 John Birch, 1981
 Roger Birnstingl, 2007
 John Bishop, 1957
 Nigel Black, 2010
 Sir Arthur Bliss, 1927
 George Blunden, 1989
 Daphne Boden, 1998
 Alfie Boe, 2013
 Barbara Boissard, 1975
 Nadia Boulanger, 1968
 Pierre Boulez, 1976
 Sir Adrian Boult, 1929
 Ann Boult, 1965
 Sir John Dykes Bower, 1954
 Colin Bradbury, 1979
 Julian Bream, 1981
 Sir Frederick Bridge, 1921
 Frank Bridge, 1924
 Edward Benjamin Britten, 1957
 Edward Brooks, 1996
 Antonio Brosa, 1962
 Sir Percy Buck, 1926
 Sir Ernest Bullock, 1929
 Herrick Bunney, 1996
 Sally Burgess, 2011
 John Burgh, 1994
 Margaret Cable, 1984
 George Caird, 1999
 David Calcutt, 1988
 Archie Camden, 1964
 Philip Cannon, 1972
 Clive Carey, 1924
 Patricia Carroll, 1997
 Louis Carus, 1983
 Pablo Casals, 1931
 Hugh Casson, 1987
 Levon Chilingirian, 1988
 George Christie, 1986
 Douglas Clarke, 1933
 Rebecca Clarke, 1963
 Anthony Cleaver, 2008
 Stephen Cleobury, 1993
 Frederic Cliffe, 1924
 Gordon Clinton, 1963
 Albert Coates, 1944
 Thomas Coats, 1966
 Walter Cobbett, 1948
 William Cole, 1968
 H. C. Colles, 1924
 Michael Collins, 2010
 Cynthia Colville, 1948
 Edward Compton, 1979
 Dame Sarah Connolly, 2008
 Edgar Cook, 1946
 Jeremy Cox, 2004
 Douglas Craig, 1973
 Laurence Cummings, 2011
 Philip Cranmer, 1976
 Eileen Croxford, 1982
 Adrian Cruft, 1981
 Benedict Cruft, 2012
 Eugene Cruft, 1971
 John Cruft, 1961
 Lionel Dakers, 1980
 Nicholas Danby, 1986
 Paul Daniel, 2002
 Harold Darke, 1937
 Denys Darlow, 1984
 Beatrix Darnell, 1964
 Thurston Dart, 1965
 Colin Davies, 1969
 Harold Davies, 1931
 Meredith Davies, 1971
 Oliver Davies, 1977
 Sir Walford Davies, 1944
 Sir Andrew Davis, 1992
 Sir Colin Davis, 1969
 Archibald Davison, 1949
 Hubert Dawkes, 1968
 Gervase de Peyer, 1992
 Leopold de Rothschild, 1977
 Norman Del Mar, 1974
 Dorothy DeLay, 1987
 Frederick Delius, 1924
 John Denison, 1961
 Edward J. Dent, 1928
 Joan Dickson, 1970
 Stephen Dodgson, 1981
 Victor Doggett, 1993
 Plácido Domingo, 1982
 George Donaldson, 1922
 Barry Douglas, 1986
 Charles Douglas Home, 1980
 Margaret Douglas Home, 1965
 Sir Edward Downes, 1984
 Ralph Downes, 1969
 Bryan Drake, 1983
 John Drummond, 1995
 Jacqueline du Pré, 1976
 Anne Dudley, 2004
 Thomas Dunhill, 1924
 John St Oswald Dykes, 1928
 Sir George Dyson, 1924
 Ruth Dyson, 1980
 Seymour Egerton, 1964
 Peter Element, 1982
 Sir Edward Elgar, 1921
 Esther Ellerman, 1976
 Pauline Elliott, 1972
 Veron Ellis, 2012
 Alexander Ernest Hall, 1954
 Sir Geraint Evans, 1981
 Christabel Falkner, 1974
 Sir Donald Keith Falkner, 1957
 Sidney Fell, 1972
 Eric Fenby, 1985
 George Fenton, 2011
 Gordon Fergus-Thompson, 2010
 Ruth Fermoy, 1983
 Raymond Ffennell, 1935
 Thomas Fielden, 1925
 Gerald Finley, 2007
 Michael Finnissy, 2008
 Warren Fisher, 1922
 Warren Fisher, 1948
 Edmond Fivet, 1988
 Amaryllis Fleming, 1994
 Myers Foggin, 1972
 Robert Jaffrey Forbes, 1933
 John Forster, 1989
 Phyllis Carey Foster, 1963
 Douglas Fox, 1973
 John Francis, 1971
 Sarah Francis, 2001
 Rodney Friend, 1989
 James Friskin, 1963
 Herbert Fryer, 1922
 Ursula Gale, 1964
 Sir James Galway, 1981
 MD Gambier-Parry, 1961
 Gustave Garcia, 1931
 Lilian Gaskell, 1964
 George Henry Gater, 1948
 Martin Gatt, 2002
 Ruth Gerald, 1985
 Sir Alexander Gibson, 1972
 Gerald Gifford, 1988
 Kenneth Gilbert, 2001
 Ruth Gipps, 1972
 Amanda Glauert, 2014
 Dame Evelyn Glennie, 1991
 Jane Glover, 1993
 Sir Dan Godfrey, 1944
 Alexander Goehr, 1981
 Sir Reginald Goodall, 1981
 Roy Goodman, 2005
 Eugene Goossens, 1938
 Léon Goossens, 1962
 Marie Goossens, 1981
 Sidonie Goossens, 1981
 June Gordon, 1966
 Michael Gough Mathews, 1972
 Peter Graeme, 1979
 David Graham, 2011
 Wilfred Greenhouse Allt, 1964
 Edward Gregson, 2000
 Sir Charles Groves, 1961
 Douglas Guest, 1964
 Natalia Gutman, 2006
 Patrick Hadley, 1936
 Sir William Henry Hadow, 1937
 Ida Haendel, 2000
 Bernard Haitink, 1984
 Lloyd Hall, 1999
 Kerrison Hamilton Camden, 1992
 Vernon Handley, 1972
 Nikolaus Harnoncourt, 1996
 Heather Harper, 1988
 Lynn Harrell, 1994
 Martin Harris, 1988
 Michael Harris, 2009
 William Harris, 1936
 Eric Harrison, 1968
 Eiddwen Harrhy, 2012
 Fritz Hart, 1930
 Sir Hamilton Harty, 1921
 Jonathan Harvey, 1994
 Kevin Hathway, 1998
 Henry Havergal, 1968
 Brian Hawkins, 1991
 Hearn Harry Stubbs, 1949
 Edward Heath, 1966
 Sir Bernard Heinze, 1925
 Gavin Henderson, 2001
 Trevor Herbert, 2007
 Alan Hervey, 1972
 Arthur Hill, 1938
 Janet Hilton, 2005
 Leonard Hirsch, 1971
 Lilian Hochhauser, 1991
 David Hockings, 2013
 Gustav Holst, 1938
 Imogen Holst, 1966
 Wolfgang Holzmair, 2008
 Antony Hopkins, 1964
 Joseph Horovitz, 1981
 Ian Horsburgh, 1988
 Colin Horsley, 1973
 John Hosier, 1981
 David Hoult, 2004
 Elgar Howarth, 1997
 Herbert Howells, 1933
 Frank Howes, 1938
 Marjorie Humby, 1965
 Ian Hunter, 1991
 Peter Hurford, 1987
 Christopher Hyde-Smith, 1985
 Professor Barry Ife, 2013
 Niel Immelman, 2000
 John Ireland, 1931
 Leonard Isaacs, 1983
 Steven Isserlis, 2002
 Gordon Jacob, 1946
 Reginald Jacques, 1937
 Ivor James, 1928
 Stephen Johns, 2014
 Peter Jonas, 1989
 Dame Gwyneth Jones, 1971
 Ian Jones, 2014
 Kenneth Victor Jones, 1981
 Philip Jones, 1983
 Rosemary Joshua, 2009
 Helen Just, 1966
 Simon Keenlyside, 2012
 Charles Kennedy Scott, 1961
 Ivor Keys, 1982
 Nicholas David King, 1992
 Dame Thea King, 1973
 Margaret Kingsley, 1994
 Herbert Kinsey, 1950
 Percival Kirby, 1924
 Dame Emma Kirkby, 2004
 CH Kitson, 1928
 Hilda Klein, 1965
 Gerald Knight, 1968
 Oliver Knussen, 1989
 Helmut Lachenmann, 2010
 Michael Laird, 1993
 John Lambert, 1976
 Philip Langridge, 1997
 Stephen Lansberry, 1989
 Vanessa Latarche, 2010
 Richard Latham, 1965
 Sylvia Latham, 1991
 David Lawman, 1991
 Colin Lawson, 2005
 Sir Philip Ledger, 1983
 Nicola Frances LeFanu 1995
 Kenneth Leighton, 1982
 Raymond Leppard, 1983
 WH Leslie, 1924
 Anthony Lewis, 1971
 Henry Ley, 1928
 John Lill, 1970
 Redvers Llewellyn, 1973
 David Lloyd-Jones, 1988
 Lord  Andrew Lloyd Webber, 1988
 Julian Lloyd Webber, 1994
 William Lloyd Webber, 1963
 James Lockhart, 1987
 C Thornton Lofthouse, 1951
 Kathleen Long, 1954
 Dame Felicity Lott, 2005
 George Loughlin, 1961
 David Lumsden, 1980
 Witold Lutosławski, 1987
 Dame Elisabeth Lutyens, 1982
 Dame Moura Lympany, 1995
 Robert Lyttleton, 1935
 Lorin Maazel, 1981
 Terence MacDonagh, 1963
 Hugh Macdonald, 1987
 Sir Alexander Mackenzie, 1922
 Sir Charles Mackerras, 1987
 Neil Mackie, 1996
 Catherine MacKintosh, 1994
 Hilary Macklin, 1962
 Sir Ernest MacMillan, 1933
 George MacMillan, 1927
 Dame Elizabeth Maconchy, 1984
 Margaret Major, 1992
 George Malcolm, 1974
 John Manduell, 1980
 Jane Manning, 1998
 Veronica Mansfield, 1968
 David Mason, 1992
 Sir Stanley Marchant, 1937
 Sir Neville Marriner, 1981
 Wayne Marshall, 2010
 Diego Masson, 1994
 Valerie Masterson, 1992
 Tobias Matthay, 1933
 Colin Matthews, 2007
 Humphrey Maud, 2002
 Sir Peter Maxwell Davies, 1994
 Sir Robert Mayer, 1938
 Ettore Mazzoleni, 1961
 John McCabe, 1984
 John McCaro, 1980
 James Paul McCartney, 1995
 John McCaw, 1980
 Sir John Blackwood McEwen, 1925
 David McKenna, 1959
 Reginald McKenna, 1933
 Sir William McKie, 1957
 Hugh McLean, 1985
 Kathleen McQuitty, 1958
 Simon McVeigh, 2007
 Zubin Mehta, 1989
 Isolde Menges, 1954
 Lord Yehudi Menuhin, 1965
 Frank Merrick, 1938
 Mark Messenger, 2009
 Olivier Messiaen, 1975
 Connie Middleton, 2001
 Susan Milan, 1999
 Anthony Milner, 1973
 Donald Mitchell, 2004
 William Mival, 2008
 Douglas Moore, 1968
 Gerald Moore, 1980
 Gillian Moore, 2000
 Charles Morley, 1933
 Douglas Morpeth, 1985
 R. O. Morris, 1938
 Angus Morrison, 1954
 Peter Morrison, 1964
 The Countess of Munster, 1976
 Michael Musgrave, 2005
 Ivor Newton, 1966
 Arthur Nickson, 1963
 Noel Nickson, 1977
 Tatiana Nikolayeva, 1991
 Humphrey Norrington, 1999
 Sir Roger Norrington, 1992
 Ruth Nye, 2008
 Leslie O’Brien, 1979
 James O’Donnell, 2009
 W. Arundel Orchard, 1921
 Robin Orr, 1965
 Nigel Osborne, 1996
 Igor Oistrakh, 1991
 Ruth Packer, 1968
 Arnold Palmer, 1942
 Ernest Palmer, 1921
 Gordon Palmer, 1965
 Adelaide Parker, 1966
 David Parkhouse, 1972
 Sir Walter Parratt, 1921
 Geoffrey Parsons, 1987
 Anthony Payne, 2005
 Sir Peter Pears, 1970
 Donald Peart, 1957
 Delia Peel, 1954
 Sir Krzysztof Penderecki, 1993
 Murray Perahia, 1987
 Allen Percival, 1973
 Frank Percival Probyn, 1954
 Itzhak Perlman, 1983
 J Harvey Phillips, 1963
 Linda Phillips, 1972
 Anthony Pini, 1972
 Trevor Pinnock, 1996
 William Pleeth, 1988
 Stuart Pleydell-Bouverie, 1942
 Harry Plunket Greene, 1935
 Edwin Polkinhorne, 1946
 Brian Pollard, 1998
 Lord Ponsonby, 1966
 Douglas Pope, 1963
 Richard Popplewell, 1982
 George Pratt, 1999
 Simon Preston, 1986
 Curtis Price, 2002
 Daniel Price, 1925
 Humphrey Procter-Gregg, 1963
 Sir John Pritchard, 1983
 Leo Quayle, 1961
 Ruth Railton, 1965
 Itzhak Rashkovsky, 1998
 Ernest Read, 1962
 John Redcliffe-Maud, 1964
 W. H. Reed, 1928
 Eillen Reynolds, 1976
 Sviatoslav Richter, 1992
 Frederick Riddle, 1968
 Alan Ridout, 1982
 Achille Rivarde, 1921
 Bernard Roberts, 1981
 Jeremy Dale Roberts, 1991
 James Robertson, 1964
 Marisa Robles, 1983
 Sir Landon Ronald, 1924
 Cyril Rootham, 1933
 Charles Rosen, 1997
 Michael Rosewell, 2001
 Mstislav Rostropovich, 1983
 Alan Rowlands, 1982
 Edwin Roxburgh, 1976
 Patricia Rozario, 2014
 Gennady Rozhdestvensky, 1993
 Edmund Rubbra, 1982
 Arthur Rubinstein, 1974
 John Russell, 1979
 Gary Ryan, 2013
 Suhail Saba, 1992
 Simon John Sacha, 1992
 Stanley Sadie, 1994
 Esa-Pekka Salonen, 1995
 Timothy Salter, 2004
 Albert Sammons, 1944
 Harold Samuel, 1924
 Sir Malcolm Sargent, 1929
 András Schiff, 1992
 Gottfried Scholz, 2002
 Peter Schreier, 2002
 Graziella Sciutti, 1992
 Marion Margaret Scott, 1953
 Humphrey Searle, 1969
 Nicholas Sears, 2012
 Andrés Segovia, 1962
 Phyllis Sellick, 1974
 Herbert Sharpe, 1921
 Martin Shaw, 1958
 Howard Shelley, 1993
 Frederick Shinn, 1944
 Bernard Shore, 1957
 JT Shrimpton, 1971
 Jean Sibelius, 1933
 Millicent Silver, 1976
 Arnold Smith, 1928
 Cuthbert Smith, 1958
 Cyril Smith, 1958
 James Smith, 1954
 Joanna Smith, 1981
 Morris Smith, 1963
 Russell Smythe, 2014
 Alexander Sokolov, 2014
 Yonty Solomon, 1996
 Sir Georg Solti, 1980
 Sir Arthur Somervell, 1930
 Donald Somervell, 1948
 Maurice Sons, 1937
 William Squire, 1924
 Meriel St Clair, 1972
 Sir John Stainer, 1961
 Sir Charles Villiers Stanford, 1921
 Jack Steadman, 1972
 Bernard Stevens, 1966
 Katharine Stewart-Murray, 1944
 Leopold Stokowski, 1937
 Ian Stoutzker, 1969
 Richard Strauss, 1934
 Harry Stubbs, 1922
 Stanley Stubbs, 1921
 Marion Studholme, 1983
 Herbert Sumsion, 1961
 Dame Joan Sutherland, 1981
 Robert Sutherland, 2005
 Freda Swain, 1962
 Roderick Swanston, 1994
 Melvyn Tan, 2000
 Geoffrey Tankard, 1961
 Colin Taylor, 1962
Edgar Kendall Taylor, 1954
 Robert Tear, 1980
 Sir George Thalben-Ball, 1951
 Reginald Thatcher, 1942
 Kevin Thompson, 2006
 Gordon Thorne, 1961
 Charles Thorton Lofthouse, 1951
 Sir Michael Tippett, 1961
 Ernest Tomlinson, 1957
 Paul Tortelier, 1979
 Arturo Toscanini, 1937
 Sir Donald Tovey, 1924
 Brian Trowell, 1977
 Carrie Tubb, 1976
 Barry Tuckwell, 1993
 Mark-Anthony Turnage, 2002
 Dame Eva Turner, 1974
 John Tyrrell, 2009
 Dame Mitsuko Uchida, 1998
 Lyndon Van der Pump, 1994
 Jaroslav Vanecek, 1979
 Ralph Vaughan Williams, 1922
 Ursula Vaughan Williams, 1976
 Maxim Vengerov, 2000
 Roger Vignoles, 1997
 Albert Visetti, 1921
 Sidney Pearce Waddington, 1922
 Rick Wakeman, 2012
 Edward Walker, 1972
 Ernest Walker, 1933
 Sarah Walker, 1987
 John Wallace, 2007
 Bernard Walton, 1968
 Richard Walton, 1968
 Sir William Walton, 1937
 David Ward, 1972
 Eleanor Warren, 1994
 William Waterhouse, 2008
 Fanny Waterman, 1971
 Harold Watkins Shaw, 1974
 Angus Watson, 1986
 Sydney Watson, 1948
 Sir David Webster, 1964
 Dame Gillian Weir, 2000
 Judith Weir, 2006
 Anthony Weldon, 1989
 Sir Jack Westrup, 1961
 Seymour Whinyates, 1962
 William Edward Whitehouse, 1921
 W Whittaker, 1930
 Richard Wilberforce, 1965
 Philip Wilkinson, 1970
 Mabel Willard Richie, 1969
 Sir David Willcocks, 1971
 John Williams, 1983
 Arthur Wilson, 1995
 Henry Wilson, 1958
 John Wilson, 2011
 Marie Wilson, 1971
 Steuart Wilson, 1950
 Michael Winfield, 1992
 Charles Wood, 1921
 Sir Henry Wood, 1924
 Patrick Wright, 1994
 Roger Wright, 2007
 Yu Chun Yee, 1988
 Wing-sie Yip 2010
 Robert Younger, 1924
 Irina Zaritskaya, 1999
 Yossi Zivoni, 2006

Sources
 List of FRCMs
  RCM: Honours and Fellowships 2013

References

Fellows of the Royal College of Music